Cecropia maxonii is a species of plant in the family Urticaceae. It is endemic to Panama.

It is named for the botanist William Ralph Maxon.

References

Endemic flora of Panama
maxonii
Data deficient plants
Taxonomy articles created by Polbot